The HC-9 was a mechanical cipher device manufactured by the Swedish company AB Transvertex. It was  designed in the early 1950's for the Swedish Armed Forces and in use from 1963 to 1995 as Krypteringsapparat 301 (Kryapp 301). This  machine was used for low-level communications such as platoon, company, up to battalion levels and in regimental and brigade staffs.The machine dimensions are 18 x 15 x 7 cm.

Operation
The HC-9 made use of punched cards instead of the pin-wheel mechanisms of other machines (for example, the Hagelin M-209).

External links
 Photograph of an HC-9
 Another HC-9 photograph with a description
 A description of the machine and a simulator in QBASIC
 Discussion of the machine's operation
 How it worked with photos and manual.

References
 Cipher A. Deavours and Louis Kruh, The Swedish HC-9 Ciphering Machine, Cryptologia,  Vol. 13(3), July 1989, pp. 251–265
 Cipher A. Deavours and Louis Kruh, The Swedish HC-9 Ciphering Machine Challenge, Cryptologia,  Vol. 14(2), April 1990, pp. 139–144
 H. P. Greenough, Cryptanalysis of the Swedish HC-9: A Known-Plaintext Approach, Cryptologia, 1997, 21(4), pp353–367.

Encryption devices